Cedrick Lukanda Kalombo  (born 2 June 1983) is a South African basketball player at Clayton State University in the United States and the South Africa national basketball team. He competed with South Africa at the 2009 FIBA Africa Championship.

References

1983 births
Living people
Clayton State Lakers men's basketball players
South African men's basketball players
South African expatriate basketball people
South African expatriates in the United States